A suicide door is an automobile door hinged at its rear rather than the front. Such doors were originally used on horse-drawn carriages, but are rarely found on modern vehicles, primarily because they are perceived as being less safe than a front-hinged door. Being rear-hinged, if the vehicle was moving and the door opened, the driver/passenger would have to lean forward and out of the vehicle to close it. As seat belts were not in common use at that time, the risk of falling out of the car and into traffic was high, hence the name "suicide door".

Initially standard on many models, later they became popularized in the custom car trade. Automobile manufacturers call the doors coach doors (Rolls-Royce and Lincoln), flexdoors (Opel), freestyle doors (Mazda), rear access doors (Saturn), or simply describe them as rear-hinged doors.

History

Rear-hinged doors were common on cars manufactured in the first half of the 20th century, including the iconic Citroën Traction Avant. In the era before seat belts, the accidental opening of such doors meant that there was a greater risk of falling out of the vehicle compared to front-hinged doors, where airflow pushed the doors closed rather than opening them further.

Rear-hinged doors were especially popular with mobsters in the gangster era of the 1930s, supposedly owing to the ease of pushing passengers out of moving vehicles with the air around the moving car holding the door open, according to Dave Brownell, the former editor of Hemmings Motor News.

After World War II, rear-hinged doors were mostly limited to rear doors of four-door sedans. The best-known use of rear-hinged doors on post-World War II American automobiles was the Lincoln Continental 4-door convertibles and  sedans (1961–1969), Cadillac Eldorado Brougham  1956–1959 four-door sedans, and Ford Thunderbird 1967–1971 four-door sedans. The British Rover P4 used rear-hinged doors at the rear. German Goggomobil saloons and coupes had two-door bodies with rear-hinged doors until 1964. The French, hand-made Facel Vega Excellence offered a four-door hardtop with a Chrysler-sourced Hemi V8 beginning in 1954.

Modern use

In 2003, the new Rolls-Royce Phantom car (sold in the United Kingdom) reintroduced independent rear-hinged doors in luxury vehicle applications. Other luxury models with rear-hinged  doors include the Spyker D8 and the Rolls-Royce Phantom Drophead Coupe four-seat convertible. The most recent mass-produced model with such doors may be the Opel Meriva, followed by the Rolls-Royce Cullinan in 2018, and a few Chinese electric vehicles including the Singulato iS6 in 2018 and HiPhi X in 2020. Lincoln announced that 80 limited-edition 2019 Continentals would be made with "coach" doors, marking the Continental's 80th anniversary. The 2020 Citroen Ami electric vehicle is unusual in having a suicide door for the driver but a conventional door for the passenger, as the doors are identical units that are not differentiated by side.

In recent years, rear-hinged rear doors that are held closed by the front doors, and cannot be opened until released by opening the front door on the same side (hinged at the front), have appeared on a number of vehicles. Such doors may be referred to as clamshell doors. Examples include extended-cab pickup trucks, the Saturn SC, Saturn Ion Quad Coupe, Honda Element, Toyota FJ Cruiser, BMW i3, Mazda RX-8, Mazda MX-30 and Fiat 500 3+1.

Rear passenger rear-hinged doors had long been used on Austin FX4 London taxis, discontinued on their successors the TX1, TXII and TX4, but reintroduced in the 2018 LEVC TX.

Several concept cars have featured rear-hinged doors, such as the Lincoln C, a hatchback with no B-pillar and rear-hinged doors at the rear, or the Carbon Motors Corporation E7, a police car with rear rear-hinged doors designed to aid officers getting handcuffed passengers in and out of the back seat. The Kia Naimo, an electric concept car, also has rear suicide doors.

Other car manufacturers which have produced models with suicide doors include Citroën, Lancia,  Opel, Panhard, Rover, Saab, Saturn, Škoda, Studebaker, Ferrari, Mazda and Volkswagen.

Advantages

Rear-hinged doors make entering and exiting a vehicle easier, allowing a passenger to enter by turning to sit and exit by stepping forward and out. This is important for passengers who need to make a dignified entrance; the UK State Bentley has rear-opening passenger doors that are broader than usual and open very wide, allowing the monarch to exit the car in a dignified way.

In combination with traditional front doors, rear-hinged doors allow chauffeurs easier access to the rear door. In Austin FX4 taxis, drivers were able to reach the rear exterior door handle through the driver's window without getting out of the vehicle.

Rear-hinged doors also allow a better position for a person installing a child seat into the back seat of a vehicle than conventional doors, while being simpler and cheaper to build than the sliding doors commonly used on minivans. The Opel Meriva B compact MPV introduced in 2010 had such doors.

The combination of front-hinged front doors and rear-hinged rear doors allows for a design without the B-pillar, creating a large opening for entering and exiting the vehicle.

Disadvantages

When front doors are directly adjacent to rear suicide doors, exiting and entering the vehicle can be awkward if people try to use the front and back doors at the same time.

There are also a number of safety hazards:

 Aerodynamic factors forcing rear-hinged doors open at speed in older cars. In 1969, Consumer Reports reported this problem on a Subaru 360.
 If a person not wearing a seat belt falls out of a moving car with a coach door, the door can catch them and drag them along the road at speed, causing serious injuries.
 If a person exits a vehicle while parallel parked and a car hits the door from the rear, the person would be crushed instead of the door being ripped off. 

Car manufacturers mitigate these hazards with such safety features as seat belts, and locks requiring front-hinged doors be open before permitting rear-hinged doors to open.

See also

Butterfly doors
Canopy doors
Gull-wing doors
List of cars with non-standard door designs
Scissor doors
Sliding doors
Swan doors

References

Automotive styling features
Car doors